The John Bumpstead House is a historic house located at 473 Woodbury Road in Cold Spring Harbor, Suffolk County, New York.

Description and history 
It is a small, 1½-story clapboard dwelling with a shed roof side wing built in about 1835. Also on the property are a late-19th-century shed and barn.

It was added to the National Register of Historic Places on September 26, 1985.

References

Houses on the National Register of Historic Places in New York (state)
Houses completed in 1835
Houses in Suffolk County, New York
National Register of Historic Places in Suffolk County, New York